Cochlospermum gillivraei is a tree in the family Bixaceae, with the common name kapok. It is native to Northern Australia.

References

gillivraei